Constantino Miranda (11 April 1925 – 22 April 1999) was a Spanish long-distance and steeplechase runner who competed in the 1948 Summer Olympics.

References

1925 births
1999 deaths
Spanish male long-distance runners
Spanish male steeplechase runners
Olympic athletes of Spain
Athletes (track and field) at the 1948 Summer Olympics